The Imprudent Young Couple is a play written by Henry Guy Carleton. It premiered on Broadway in 1895 and was produced by Charles Frohman. It starred Maude Adams and John Drew, Jr., and featured Arthur Byron. The production marked the Broadway debut of Drew's niece, Ethel Barrymore.

References

Sources

1895 plays
Broadway plays
Plays by Henry Guy Carleton